The Texas Rangers are a Major League Baseball (MLB) franchise based in the Dallas–Fort Worth metropolitan area. They play in the American League West division. Before 1972 (and for the first seven years of the draft), they were known as the Washington Senators and based in Washington, D.C. Since the institution of MLB's Rule 4 Draft, the Rangers franchise has selected 68 players in the first round. Officially known as the "First-Year Player Draft", the Rule 4 Draft is MLB's primary mechanism for assigning amateur baseball players from high schools, colleges, and other amateur baseball clubs to its teams. The draft order is determined based on the previous season's standings, with the team possessing the worst record receiving the first pick. In addition, teams which lost free agents in the previous off-season may be awarded compensatory or supplementary picks.

Of the 71 players picked in the first round by Washington or Texas, 37 have been pitchers, the most of any position; 27 of these were right-handed, while 10 were left-handed. Twelve outfielders, nine third basemen, six shortstops, four catchers, two first basemen, and one second baseman were also taken. Fourteen of the players came from high schools or colleges in the state of Texas, and California follows with ten players. The Rangers have drafted one player, Tanner Scheppers in 2009, who was playing in the American Association of Independent Professional Baseball at the time of the draft. Scheppers was originally drafted by the Baltimore Orioles in the 29th round of the 2005 MLB Draft, and by the Pittsburgh Pirates in the second round of the 2008 MLB Draft.

None of the Rangers' first-round picks have won a World Series championship with the team, and no pick has been elected to the Hall of Fame. None of these picks have won the MLB Rookie of the Year award, although Oddibe McDowell (1984) placed fourth in the voting in 1985. The Rangers had the first overall selection twice in the draft, which they used on Jeff Burroughs (1969) and David Clyde (1973). Clyde made his debut for the Rangers 20 days after he pitched his high school team to the state finals in the franchise's first sellout at Arlington Stadium.

The Rangers have made 19 selections in the supplemental round of the draft and 26 compensatory picks since the institution of the First-Year Player Draft in 1965. These additional picks are provided when a team loses a particularly valuable free agent in the previous off-season, or, more recently, if a team fails to sign a draft pick from the previous year. The Rangers have failed to sign one of their first-round picks, Matt Purke (2009), and received the 15th pick in 2010 as compensation.

Key

Picks

See also
Texas Rangers minor league players

Notes

References
Specific

General

First-round
Texas Rangers